Aquilair SA is a French aircraft manufacturer based in Theizé. The company specializes in the design and manufacture of ultralight trikes.

The company originally produced named trike models with specific wing and engine combinations, such as their Aquilair Swing two-seater and Aquilair Kid single-seater. By 2014 they had moved to a modular system offering any combination of their single seat carriage (Chariot Monoplace) or two seat carriage (Chariot Biplace), five models of Ipsos wings made by La Mouette, various propellers, the  Rotax 582 twin cylinder, inline, liquid-cooled two-stroke or the  Verner VM133MK two cylinder, horizontally-opposed, four-stroke engines, instruments, radios and intercoms.

Aircraft

References

External links

Aircraft manufacturers of France
Ultralight trikes
Homebuilt aircraft
Companies based in Auvergne-Rhône-Alpes